Janesville Public Library may refer to:

Janesville Free Public Library, Janesville, Minnesota, listed on the National Register of Historic Places in Waseca County, Minnesota
Janesville Public Library (Janesville, Wisconsin), listed on the National Register of Historic Places in Rock County, Wisconsin